Ulrich Mense (29 January 1927 in Rostock – 14 February 2003) was an East German sailor who competed in the 1964 Summer Olympics.

References

1927 births
2003 deaths
German male sailors (sport)
Olympic sailors of the United Team of Germany
Sailors at the 1964 Summer Olympics – Dragon
Olympic silver medalists for the United Team of Germany
Olympic medalists in sailing
Sportspeople from Rostock
People from the Free State of Mecklenburg-Schwerin
Medalists at the 1964 Summer Olympics